Hajipur is a community development block located in Vaishali district, Bihar.

Villages
Number of Panchayat :26
Number of Villages : 213

Population and communities
Male Population :185532 (2009 ist.)
Female Population : 164162 
Total Population : 349694  
SC Total Population : 73433  
ST Total Population : 112  
Minority Total Population : 28251  
Population Density : 2229  
Sex Ratio : 895

Education
Literacy rate : 72.7% (2001 ist.)
Male literacy rate : 61.6%
Female literacy rate : 49.1%

School
Primary School : 150 (2009 ist.)
Upper Primary School : 118

See also
List of villages in Hajipur block

References 

Hajipur
Community development blocks in Vaishali district
Community development blocks in Bihar